István Horthy de Nagybánya II (born 17 January 1941 in Budapest) is a Hungarian physicist and architect, son of Hungarian deputy regent István Horthy and Ilona Edelsheim-Gyulai, and grandson of Admiral Miklós Horthy who served as Regent of Hungary from 1920 to 1944. In 1965 he converted to Islam and took the name Sharif Horthy. Horthy is a prominent member of the Indonesian spiritual association Subud, and has translated works by its founder, Subuh Sumohadiwidjojo, into English.

He graduated in 1962 with a degree in physics from Oxford University. He earned a second degree in Civil Engineering at Imperial College in 1966. He worked as a consulting engineer in England and later in the Far East where he founded and managed two major Indonesian companies in the fields of consulting engineering, construction and property development. After years in Boston, in the United States, from where he assisted clients in Europe, the Pacific Rim and the United States with their international business strategies, Horthy settled in England. He has been married twice: his first wife was Henrietta Josephine Chamberlain; they have five children. Sharif is currently married to Tuti, a Javanese woman, and lives with her in Lewes, East Sussex.

References

External links 
 Sharif Horthy rövid életrajza
 Horthy írása a szubudról 
 Horthy Sharif, Magyar Televízió, Különös történetek, 2008. November 12. 

1941 births
Living people
Converts to Islam
Istvan II
Architects from Budapest
Engineers from Budapest
Hungarian expatriates in Indonesia
Hungarian expatriates in the United Kingdom
Hungarian Muslims
Hungarian nobility
20th-century Hungarian physicists
Hungarian Subud members